VirtualRealPorn is a company producing virtual reality pornography that was founded in 2013. The company's headquarters is located in Zaragoza, Spain, with additional offices in Granada and Barcelona, where most of the video shoots take place. The company is known for producing the first films in virtual reality with sexual content for adults.

History 
The company was founded  in 2015 by Mike Kowalski. 

All productions feature virtual reality videos which may be visualized by using virtual reality headsets or phones.

Teledildonics 
In 2015, the collaboration of all VirtualRealPorn websites with Dutch company Kiiroo and Chinese Lovense was announced; synchronizing their remote sex Masturbators to its virtual reality audiovisual content.

VRLove 
Since 2017, VirtualRealPorn is supporting the ongoing development of VRLove, an online multiplayer video game created in a 3D format and virtual reality with pornographic content.

Reception
In 2017, VirtualRealPorn was appointed the best virtual reality porn site by The Daily Dot.

Ranking 
As of July 2021, VirtualRealPorn has a traffic ranking of 362,631.

References 

Spanish erotica and pornography websites
Internet properties established in 2013
2013 establishments in Spain